Atwater High School is a secondary school in Atwater, California, United States. It is a part of the Merced Union High School District. AHS competes as a member of the Central California League of the Sac-Joaquin Section.

Notable alumni
Jamill Kelly Wrestling Olympic silver medalist
Bernard Berrian, former NFL wide receiver
Carrie Henn, child actress in the 1986 film Aliens
Bill Mooneyham, former major league pitcher
Larry Howard, former major league catcher

References

External links
 Atwater High School

High schools in Merced County, California
Public high schools in California